Evangelismos is a town near the southern coast of Messenia, Greece. The town is the main settlement in Evangelismos Community which itself is part of the Methoni municipal unit within the Pylos-Nestoras municipal district. Nearby villages include Dentroulia and Kamaria.

Other settlements within Evangelismos Community
Amoulaki
Dentroulia
Kamaria
Kavouriano
Palialona

Historical population

See also
List of settlements in Messenia

References

Populated places in Messenia